Rx (sometimes written ) is a common abbreviation for medical prescriptions derived from the Latin word for recipe, recipere.

RX, Rx, or rx may also refer to:

Arts, entertainment, and media
 or Rx, a young adult novel by Elizabeth J. Braswell published in 2005 under the pseudonym Tracy Lynn
Rx (band), an industrial rock band formed by Nivek Ogre and Martin Atkins
Rx, an album by Ryan Beaver (2016)
"Rx (Medicate)", a song by Canadian rock band Theory of a Deadman
Rx (mixtape), an upcoming mixtape by Rico Nasty
"rX" (The Gifted), an episode of the television series The Gifted
Kamen Rider Black RX, a Japanese superhero television series
Rx (film), a 2005 romantic thriller film

Science and technology

Computing and electronics
Rx, "Receive", "receiver" or "reception", in various telecommunications applications
Rx, the receive signal in the RS-232 serial communication standard
Rx, the remote procedure call mechanism used by the Andrew File System
Radeon RX series, a series of graphics products from AMD
Reactive extensions, originally for .NET, later ported to other languages and environments
Rx bridge, a device for measuring the characteristic resistance and impedance of antenna or feedline system
Rx meters, a term used in electrical engineering
RX microcontroller family, by Renesas Electronics

Vehicles
Lexus RX, a series of luxury crossover SUV
Mazda RX, a series of sport cars
South Australian Railways R class (Rx class locomotive), of the South Australian Railways
Yamaha RX 100, a 2-stroke Yamaha motorcycle

Other uses in science and technology
Retinal homeobox protein Rx, a transcription factor in vertebrate eye development
Roket Eksperimental, an Indonesian experimental rocket series

Other uses
Apparent retrograde motion of planets in astrology
Rallycross, a motor sport
Regent Airways, a Bangladeshi airline (IATA code RX)
Rye, East Sussex, UK, in fishing boat registrations
, a numismatic abbreviation for reverse
RX Global, an exhibition company